A multibagger stock is an equity stock which gives a return of more than 100%. The term was coined by Peter Lynch in his 1988 book One Up on Wall Street and comes from baseball where "bags" or "bases" that a runner reaches are the measure of the success of a play. For example, a ten bagger is a stock which gives returns equal to 10 times the investment, while a twenty bagger stock gives a return of 20 times.

This term is especially common when discussing high-growth industries and emerging markets such as the BRICS. As with most investment metrics, past performance is no guarantee of future returns, and multibag returns may be indicative of either sustained growth or an investment bubble.

Examples
Examples of multibagger stocks on the NASDAQ in 2015 were:
 Energy Focus Inc: A return of more than 1700% in the last 2 years. (as on 16 October 2015)
 EBIX Inc: A return of more than 200% in the last 2 years. (as on 16 October 2015)
 Expedia Inc: A return of more than 200% in the last 2 years. (as on 16 October 2015)
 Netflix Inc: A return of more than 200% in the last 2 years. (as on 16 October 2015)

Examples of multibagger stocks in India in 2015 were:
Uniply Industries: A return of more than 1400% in the last 1 year. (as on 24 September 2015)
Mangalam Drugs: A return of more than 400% in the last 1 year. (as on 24 September 2015)
Intrasoft Technologies: A return of more than 600% in the last 1 year. (as on 24 September 2015)
Lanco Industries: A return of more than 400% in the last 1 year. (as on 24 September 2015)
Shreyas Shipping & Logistic: A return of more than 500% in the last 1 year. (as on 24 September 2015) 
Symphony Limited: A return of more than 9,000% in the last 10 years. (as on December 5, 2016)
Tanla Platforms: A return of 1500% in last three years (as on 7 June, 2022)

References

Further reading
http://economictimes.indiatimes.com/markets/stocks/news/india-a-4-trillion-economy-in-the-making-expect-multibagger-return-from-equities/articleshow/49041326.cms
http://economictimes.indiatimes.com/marketstats/pid-0,pageno-1,sort-1year,sortby-percentchange,sortorder-desc.cms

Equity securities